West Cameron Township is a township in Northumberland County, Pennsylvania, United States. The population at the 2010 Census was 541, an increase over the figure of 517 tabulated in 2000.

Geography

According to the United States Census Bureau, the township has a total area of 11.8 square miles (30.7 km2), all  land.

Demographics

As of the census of 2000, there were 517 people, 192 households, and 149 families residing in the township. The population density was 43.7 people per square mile (16.9/km2). There were 205 housing units at an average density of 17.3/sq mi (6.7/km2). The racial makeup of the township was 100.00% White. Hispanic or Latino of any race were 0.19% of the population.

There were 192 households, out of which 31.3% had children under the age of 18 living with them, 66.7% were married couples living together, 5.2% had a female householder with no husband present, and 21.9% were non-families. 19.3% of all households were made up of individuals, and 9.4% had someone living alone who was 65 years of age or older. The average household size was 2.69 and the average family size was 3.05.

In the township the population was spread out, with 23.4% under the age of 18, 7.9% from 18 to 24, 30.6% from 25 to 44, 24.6% from 45 to 64, and 13.5% who were 65 years of age or older. The median age was 39 years. For every 100 females, there were 110.2 males. For every 100 females age 18 and over, there were 109.5 males.

The median income for a household in the township was $32,813, and the median income for a family was $35,625. Males had a median income of $31,250 versus $19,000 for females. The per capita income for the township was $14,563. About 5.7% of families and 4.7% of the population were below the poverty line, including 7.5% of those under age 18 and 8.4% of those age 65 or over.

References

Townships in Northumberland County, Pennsylvania
Townships in Pennsylvania